Charles Westley Abbott (February 25, 1877 – June 26, 1941) was an American football coach and lawyer.  He served as the head football coach at the University of Virginia for one season in 1901, compiling a record of 8–2. Abbott graduated  Yale University in 1899 and from New York Law School in 1901.  He practiced law in New York City as a member of law firm of Littlefield, Abbott, and Marshall.  He died at his home on the Upper East Side in New York City on June 26, 1941.

Head coaching record

References

External links
 

1877 births
1941 deaths
Virginia Cavaliers football coaches
New York Law School alumni
Yale College alumni
New York (state) lawyers
People from the Upper East Side